Inape centrota is a species of moth of the family Tortricidae and is endemic to Colombia.

The ground colour of the forewings is pale brownish creamy, suffused and sprinkled with brownish. The hindwings are creamy brownish, but browner on the periphery.

References

Moths described in 2003
Endemic fauna of Colombia
centrota
Moths of South America
Taxa named by Józef Razowski